Wirat Wangchan (born 25 February 1976) is a Thai former professional football goalkeeper who played for Thailand in the 2000 Asian Cup. He also played for Sinthana and Thai Port FC.

External links
 11v11 profile
 

Wirat Wangchan
Living people
1976 births
Wirat Wangchan
Wirat Wangchan
Wirat Wangchan
Wirat Wangchan
Wirat Wangchan
Wirat Wangchan
2000 AFC Asian Cup players
Association football goalkeepers
Wirat Wangchan
Southeast Asian Games medalists in football
Wirat Wangchan
Competitors at the 1999 Southeast Asian Games
Wirat Wangchan